The women's 100 metres T12 event at the 2020 Summer Paralympics in Tokyo, took place between 1 and 2 September 2021.

Records
Prior to the competition, the existing records were as follows:

Results

Heats
Heat 1 took place on 1 September 2021, at 19:37:

Heat 2 took place on 1 September 2021, at 19:45:

Heat 3 took place on 1 September 2021, at 19:53:

Heat 4 took place on 1 September 2021, at 20:01:

Semi-finals
Semi-final 1 took place on 2 September 2021, at 11:06:

Semi-final 2 took place on 2 September 2021, at 11:14:

Final
The final took place on 2 September 2021, at 19:20:

References

Women's 100 metres T12
2021 in women's athletics